Dapchi is a town in Yobe State, northeast Nigeria. It is 75 kilometres south of the border with Niger.

History

On 19 February 2018, 110 girls were kidnapped from the Government Science and Technical College in Dapchi by Boko Haram insurgents. On 21 March 2018, 101 of the girls were dropped back to the town.

References

Populated places in Yobe State